In the United Kingdom, a parliamentary by-election occurs following a vacancy arising in the House of Commons. They are often seen as a test of the rival political parties' fortunes between general elections.

Resignations

Members of the House of Commons are not technically permitted to resign. Thus, members wishing to resign or seek re-election are appointed on their own request to an "office of profit under the Crown", either the Steward of the Chiltern Hundreds or the Steward of the Manor of Northstead. Appointment to such an office automatically vacates the Member's seat. A member who resigns in this manner may stand for re-election without resigning from the office of profit.

Moving the writ for a by-election
An election to the House of Commons is formally begun by the issue of a writ by the Clerk of the Crown in Chancery. In the case of a by-election, the Speaker must first issue a warrant to the Clerk of the Crown to allow the Clerk to issue a writ. The most common reason for the Speaker to issue a warrant is that he has been required to do so by a resolution of the House of Commons itself. This requires an MP to move a motion to command the Speaker to issue his warrant. Such motions are moved at the start of proceedings in the House of Commons.

Usual parliamentary convention, codified by the Speaker's Conference in 1973, is that such a motion is moved by the Chief Whip of the party to which the former MP belonged. However, this convention is not always followed, and such a motion can be moved by an MP of another party. This can arise because the former MP did not belong to a party: the writ for the by-election arising from the death of Independent Republican Frank Maguire was moved by Jim Molyneaux, leader of the Ulster Unionist Party; and after Bobby Sands died on hunger strike the writ for a second by-election was moved by Dafydd Elis-Thomas of Plaid Cymru. When all Unionist MPs from Northern Ireland resigned to force by-elections on the Anglo-Irish Agreement, the writs were moved by senior Conservative backbencher Sir Peter Emery.

Since the date on which the writ is issued also fixes the date of the by-election, it is possible (as was done in the Northern Ireland example) to pass a motion requiring the Speaker to issue his warrant on a set future date. This procedure was followed in 1983 when Conservative MP Michael Roberts died on 10 February. On 19 April, Plaid Cymru MP Dafydd Wigley moved that a writ be issued for a by-election in Cardiff North West, explaining that the by-election was being unnecessarily delayed. The Leader of the House of Commons, John Biffen, successfully moved an amendment to provide that the writ would only be issued on 10 May, three months after his death, in accordance with the recommendations of the Speaker's Conference of 1973. In the event, on 9 May the Queen granted a dissolution of Parliament to take place on 13 May; Biffen therefore moved a motion on 10 May to discharge the previous motion. Unnecessary delay was also the explanation given for the decision of the Liberal Democrats to move the writ for the Oldham East and Saddleworth by-election in December 2010, despite the former MP having been from the Labour Party.

As moving a writ for a by-election takes priority over all other business, MPs sometimes use it as a filibustering tactic. This has been done twice by Dennis Skinner; in 1985 he scuppered a Private Member's Bill banning stem-cell research from Enoch Powell by talking extensively when moving the writ for the Brecon and Radnor by-election, and, in January 1989 he moved the writ for the Richmond (Yorks) by-election and spoke for over three hours so as to prevent Ann Widdecombe from moving a motion to grant extra time to her attempt to restrict abortion laws.

Writs in a recess
When Parliament is not sitting, the Speaker may be required to issue his writ during a recess. The first legal provision for a by-election writ to be moved in the recess was the Recess Elections Act 1784 (24 Geo. III c. 26), which remained in force until replaced by the Recess Elections Act 1975 (1975 c. 66) on 12 December 1975. The procedure for issuing a writ involves two MPs presenting the Speaker with a certificate stating that there is a vacancy. The Speaker must then publish notice of his receiving the certificate in the London Gazette; six days after inserting the notice in the London Gazette, the Speaker will issue a warrant for the new writ. Recess writs cannot be issued where the vacancy has arisen as a result of an MP resigning. The Speaker is empowered to appoint between three and seven senior MPs to exercise his powers to issue recess writs when he is out of the country or there is no Speaker.

Bankruptcy
Under section 33 of the Bankruptcy Act 1883 (46 & 47 Vict. c. 52), where a Member of Parliament is declared bankrupt, they are granted a period of six months to discharge themselves. At the end of that time the court which ordered the bankruptcy is required to notify the Speaker, and the seat is vacated. The Speaker is required to insert a notice in the London Gazette of the fact and then to issue a warrant for a new writ after six days.

Cancellation
If it comes to light that a vacancy has not properly been declared, a writ for a by-election can be cancelled by a further writ of supersedeas. The last such occasion was in 1880 when Henry Strutt (Member for Berwick-upon-Tweed) succeeded to the Peerage as Baron Belper; a writ was issued on 6 July, before Strutt had received a Writ of Summons to the House of Lords, and so the Liberal Chief Whip moved on 8 July for a writ of supersedeas to be issued.

If the polling day for a by-election is overtaken by a dissolution of Parliament, the writ is automatically cancelled.  The most recent cancellation of a planned by-election was in Manchester Gorton which was due to take place on 4 May 2017, on the same day as the local elections, but was cancelled when Prime Minister Theresa May called a snap general election for 8 June 2017 and Parliament was dissolved before 4 May.  The previous such occasion was in 1924 when a writ for a by-election in London University was issued during the recess on 22 September 1924. Four candidates were nominated when nominations closed on 1 October, with polling scheduled for 13–17 October. When the government fell over the Campbell Case, the Prime Minister obtained a snap dissolution on 9 October, and the by-election did not take place.

Reform
A Speaker's Conference on electoral law in 1973 proposed several changes to how by-elections are usually conducted:

1. The Conference, conscious that the intervals before the issue of by-election writs have on occasion been unduly prolonged, put forward the following guidelines:

(a) The motion for a writ for a by-election should normally be moved within three months of a vacancy arising.

(b) It is inexpedient for by-elections to be held in August, or at the time of local elections in April/May, or in the period from mid-December to mid-February before (under present arrangements) a new Register is issued.

(c) Consequently, if this restriction should bring the date of the by-election into one of these periods, the by-election should if practicable be held earlier. If this is impractical the period should be lengthened by the shortest possible additional time. The total period (from vacancy to the moving of the writ) should not be more than four months.

(d) In the fifth year of a Parliament, some relaxation of these guidelines should be allowed, in order if possible to avoid by-elections being held immediately before a general election.

The Speaker's Conference recommended that these provisions should be embodied in a resolution of the House, but no such resolution has been proposed.

Political significance

By-elections are often seen as tests of the popularity of the government of the day, and attract considerable media attention. Voters, knowing that the result will rarely overturn a government's majority in the Commons, may vote differently from their normal voting patterns at general elections. By-elections may reflect specific local issues, and often have lower turnout. Thus large changes in vote share can happen, and the results of by-elections can affect or highlight political parties' fortunes, as with the sequence of by-election victories by the Liberal Party in 1972–3, and the SNP's win in the 1967 Hamilton by-election.

In some cases, an MP or MPs may deliberately trigger a by-election to make a political point, as when all the sitting Unionist MPs in Northern Ireland resigned together in 1986 or as occurred in the 2008 Haltemprice and Howden by-election.

Particularly notable by-elections

See also 
For a list of by-election results since 2010, see: List of United Kingdom by-elections (2010–present)

For a list of exceptional results and records in the history of by-elections in the United Kingdom, see: United Kingdom by-election records

 List of UK parliamentary election petitions

References

External links
United Kingdom Election Results (David Boothroyd)
United Kingdom Elections (Keele University)
British Parliamentary By-Elections since 1945
F. W. S. Craig, Chronology of British Parliamentary By-elections 1833-1987